Charles Amyand Harris (1813–1874) was a priest in the Church of England and Bishop of Gibraltar.

Family
Harris, third son of James Edward Harris, 2nd Earl of Malmesbury, who died 10 September 1841, by Harriet Susan, daughter of Francis Bateman Dashwood of Well Vale, Lincolnshire, was born at Christchurch, Hampshire, 4 August 1813; his elder brother was James Harris, 3rd Earl of Malmesbury.

Life
Harris matriculated from Oriel College, Oxford, 5 May 1831, graduated B.A. 1835, and M.A. 1837. He was fellow of All Souls' College 1835–7. In 1834 he was entered as a student of the Inner Temple, but changing his mind was ordained deacon in 1836 and priest in 1837. He acted as rector of Shaftesbury, Dorset, during 1839–40. In the latter year he was appointed to the rectory of Wilton in Wiltshire, which had attached to it the rectory of Bulbridge and the vicarage of Ditchampton. On 16 August 1841 he was nominated prebendary of Chardstock in Salisbury Cathedral, and made a domestic chaplain to the bishop of the diocese. His health failed in 1848, when he resigned his livings. After some years of rest he became in 1856 the perpetual curate of Rownhams, Southampton, where Lord Herbert, in conjunction with the widow of Major Colt, had built a new parish church. In 1863, he succeeded the Rev. Henry Drury as archdeacon of Wiltshire, when he was also made vicar of Bremhill-with-Highway, near Chippenham. Here he remained an active parish priest and a coadjutor to his bishop until 1868, when he was nominated to the bishopric of Gibraltar, and consecrated on 1 May. His kindly manner, his gentle bearing, his knowledge of languages, and his long experience fitted him for his new duties. At Gibraltar he entered heartily into his work, of which he more than once gave an account at the meetings of the Society for the Propagation of the Gospel.

Death and legacy
In 1872 he was attacked by fever, and returning to England resigned his bishopric in October 1873, and settled at Torquay, where he died on 16 March 1874, and was buried at St Martins, Bremhill, Wiltshire on 19 March by the side of his wife. By his will he left considerable sums to episcopal societies, besides legacies to his relatives.

Harris had married, 20 May 1837, Katherine Lucia, youngest daughter of Sir Edward O'Brien, 4th Baronet. She died at Bremhill vicarage 31 January 1865. By her he had an only son, James Edward Harris, who died in childhood. Harris was the author of One Rule and One Mind, a sermon, 1841.

References

1813 births
1874 deaths
Alumni of Oriel College, Oxford
Archdeacons of Wilts
19th-century Anglican bishops of Gibraltar